Karreh Dan Zizi (also Romanized as Karreh Dān Zīzī; also known as Karrehdān) is a village in Ludab Rural District, Ludab District, Boyer-Ahmad County, Kohgiluyeh and Boyer-Ahmad Province, Iran. At the 2006 census, its population was 39, in 9 families.

References 

Populated places in Boyer-Ahmad County